Mpumelelo Xulu (born 28 January 1999) is a South African cricketer. He made his List A debut for KwaZulu-Natal Inland in the 2018–19 CSA Provincial One-Day Challenge on 17 March 2019.

References

External links
 

1999 births
Living people
South African cricketers
KwaZulu-Natal Inland cricketers
Place of birth missing (living people)